Amsterdam Holendrecht is a railway and metro station in Amsterdam, Netherlands.

The station opened on 14 December 2008. Before that date Holendrecht was just a station on the Amsterdam Metro network which was opened on 16 October 1977 and is now served by two lines, the 50 and 54.  It is located in Amsterdam-Zuidoost and it lies on the Amsterdam - Utrecht main line, between Amsterdam Bijlmer ArenA and Abcoude.  The station is near the Academic Medical Center.

Train services
The following train services currently call at Amsterdam Holendrecht:
2x per hour local service (Sprinter) from Uitgeest to Amsterdam, Breukelen, Woerden and Rotterdam
2x per hour local service (Sprinter) from Amsterdam to Breukelen, Utrecht and Rhenen (peak hours only)

Metro services
50 (from Isolatorweg to Sloterdijk, Lelylaan, Zuid, Duivendrecht, Bijlmer ArenA, Holendrecht and Gein)
54 (from Centraal to Amstel, Duivendrecht, Bijlmer ArenA, Holendrecht and Gein)

Bus services

The following services call at Holendrecht:

City services
These services are operated by GVB.

45: from Bijlmer ArenA to Daalwijkdreef, Bijlmerweide, Karspeldreef and Holendrecht
47: from Bijlmer ArenA to Bijlmermeer, Gaasperplas, Gaasperdam and Holendrecht

Regional services
These services are operated by Connexxion.

120: from Bijlmer ArenA to Holendrecht, Abcoude, Baambrugge, Loenen aan de Vecht, Breukelen, Maarssen, Utrecht Zuilen and Utrecht Centraal
126: from Bijlmer ArenA to Holendrecht, Abcoude, Vinkeveen, Wilnis and Mijdrecht
153: from Holendrecht to Bijlmer ArenA, Bijlmermeer, Muiden, Almere Poort, Almere Muziekwijk and Almere Buiten
155: from Holendrecht to Bijlmer ArenA, Bijlmermeer, Muiden, Almere Gooisekant and Almere Parkwijk
328: from Holendrecht to Bijlmer ArenA, Bijlmermeer, Muiden, Almere 't Oor and Almere Haven

These services are operated by EBS, branded as Bizzliner. They operate Monday to Friday only.

375: from Holendrecht to Diemen, Ilpendam and Purmerend
376: from Holendrecht to Diemen, Ilpendam, Purmerend and De Rijp
377: from Holendrecht to Diemen, Ilpendam and Purmerend
378: from Holendrecht to Diemen, Monnickendam, Volendam and Edam
379: from Holendrecht to Diemen, Monnickendam, Edam and Hoorn

External links
 NS website
 Dutch public transport journey planner

Holendrecht
Railway stations in North Holland
Railway stations opened in 2008
Railway stations on the Rhijnspoorweg
Holendrecht
Amsterdam-Zuidoost